Ceanothus megacarpus is a species of flowering shrub known by the common name bigpod ceanothus. This Ceanothus is endemic to California, where its distribution extends along the Central Coast and includes the Channel Islands.

Description
This shrub may exceed 3 meters in height and is covered in thick oval to nearly rectangular evergreen leaves. The inflorescences are small and sparse and are filled with small white to pale lavender flowers with dark centers. The fruit is a bumpy spherical red-green capsule about a centimeter wide. The inside of the capsule is divided into 3 valves, each valve holding a seed. The capsule dehisces neatly in three at the central band to release the seeds.

References

External links
Jepson Manual Treatment - Ceanothus megacarpus
USDA Plants Profile
Ceanothus megacarpus - Photo gallery

megacarpus
Endemic flora of California
Natural history of the California chaparral and woodlands
Natural history of the Channel Islands of California
Natural history of Santa Barbara County, California
Natural history of the Transverse Ranges
~
Plants described in 1846
Taxa named by Thomas Nuttall
Flora without expected TNC conservation status